Alberto Montejo Gañán (born 19 January 1988 in Zaragoza, Aragon) is a Spanish footballer who plays for CD Brea as a midfielder.

External links

1988 births
Living people
Footballers from Zaragoza
Spanish footballers
Association football midfielders
La Liga players
Segunda División B players
Tercera División players
Real Zaragoza B players
Real Zaragoza players
CD Numancia B players
CD La Muela players
CD Teruel footballers
Spain youth international footballers